Big Creek also known as East Branch Oriskany Creek is a creek in Oneida County, New York. Big Creek flows into Oriskany Creek by Deansboro, New York.

References

Rivers of New York (state)
Rivers of Oneida County, New York
Rivers of Madison County, New York